Joseph W. Jagersberger (14 February 1884 in Wiener Neustadt, Austria – 5 October 1952 in Racine, Wisconsin) was an Austrian-American racecar driver.

Background
Jagersberger immigrated to the United States in 1902, and settled in Racine, Wisconsin. He married Amanda Olle in 1919. He started working at Case Corporation in Racine to develop a car racing program.

Racing and car designer

1911 Indianapolis 500
He started eighth in the first Indianapolis 500 in 1911 in a Case chassis. The steering knuckle on his car broke and he had to bow out of the race after 87 laps, and finished 31st. The spinning car veered back and forth across the track, down the pit lane, and back on the track. It hit the judges stand, and the judges fled their posts. Jagerberger's riding mechanic flew out of the car and on the track. The next driver on the scene had to avoid the riding mechanic. Several drivers were taken out in the melee, including Harry Knight, Herber Lytle, and Eddie Hearne. Knight's riding mechanic was the only person who suffered an injury, but his back fully recovered. The leaders of the race safely navigated through the wrecked cars. The judges milled around the accident scene and did not score. Around this time Ray Harroun did a driver exchange. The incident caused a controversy about if Harroun actually won the race.

Career-ending accident
He continued to race and in November 1911, in Columbia, South Carolina, he struck a fence due to a broken steering knuckle. He was in the hospital for several months, and his right leg was amputated, which ended his racing career.

Motor company

He continued to design cylinder heads and peripheral equipment and he started his own company, Rajo Motor and Manufacturing, several years later.

Career awards
In June 2006, he was inducted into the Model T Ford Club Speedster and Racer Hall of Fame, in San Jose, California.
In April 2007, he will be inducted into the Chevy Sprints Association.
Jagersberger was inducted in the National Sprint Car Hall of Fame in June 2007 as an engine builder and manufacturer.

Indy 500 results

References

External links

1880s births
1952 deaths
Racing drivers from Wisconsin
Austrian racing drivers
Indianapolis 500 drivers
American people of Austrian descent
Sportspeople from Wiener Neustadt
Sportspeople from Racine, Wisconsin
Austro-Hungarian emigrants to the United States